Zuleima Bruff Jackson (October 9, 1843 – February 16, 1915) was an American painter, largely of floral pieces. Daughter of Joseph Goldsborough Bruff, she was born in Washington, D.C., and was taught by her father to be a "Designing Artist". In 1861 she married Danish immigrant John Jackson, a brevet major in the United States Army. She continued to live in Washington until her death. Two of her drawings are in the Library of Congress.

References

1843 births
1915 deaths
American women painters
19th-century American painters
19th-century American women artists
20th-century American painters
20th-century American women artists
Painters from Washington, D.C.